The Aitken Spence Power Station (formerly referred to as the Meethotamulla Power Station) is a municipal solid waste-fired thermal power station currently under construction at Muthurajawela, Sri Lanka. It was originally planned to be built at Meethotamulla, the site of a large solid waste landfill which was under international media spotlight after the 2017 Meethotamulla garbage landslide which killed over 30 people. The power station in being built together with the KCHT Power Station.

The facility will generate  of power, of which  will be sold to the state-owned Ceylon Electricity Board, at a rate of  generated. The power station's PUCSL energy license is EL/GS/13-03.

See also 
 List of power stations in Sri Lanka
 Muthurajawela wetlands

References

External links 
 
 

Fossil fuel power stations in Sri Lanka